This is a list of composers of African ancestry.

A

 Michael Abels, USA (born 1962)
 Mohamed Abdelwahab Abdelfattah, Egypt (born 1962)
 Muhal Richard Abrams, USA (1930–2017)
 H. Leslie Adams, USA (born 1932)
 Eleanor Alberga, Jamaica (born 1949)
 Alcione, Brazil (born 1947)
 Amanda Christina Elizabeth Aldridge (Montague Ring), England (1866–1956)
 Kenneth Amis, USA (born 1970)
 Thomas Jefferson Anderson (TJ), USA (born 1928)
 Lil Hardin Armstrong, USA (1898–1971)

B
 David Baker, USA (1931–2016)
 Count Basie, USA, pianist, bandleader
 Leon Bates, USA, pianist
 Catalina Berroa, Cuba (1849–1911)
 Eubie Blake (James Hubert Blake), USA (1883–1983)
 James A. Bland, USA (1854–1911)
 Margaret Allison Bonds, USA (1913–1972)
 John William Boone, USA (1864–1927)
 Anthony Braxton, USA (born 1945)
 George Bridgetower, Poland (1779–1860), violinist and composer
 Courtney Bryan, USA (born 1982/1983), pianist and composer
 James Tim Brymn, USA (1881–1946)
 Harry Burleigh, USA (1866–1949)

C

 Billy Childs, USA (born 1957)
 Robert Allen "Bob" Cole, USA (1868–1911)
 Samuel Coleridge-Taylor, England (1875–1912)
 Ornette Coleman, USA (1930–2015)
 Alice Coltrane, USA (1937–2007)
 John Coltrane, USA (1926–1967)
 Geraldine Connor, UK (1952–2011)
 Will Marion Cook, USA (1869–1944)
 Roque Cordero, Panama (1917–2008)
 Arthur Cunningham, USA (1928–1997)

D
 William L. Dawson, USA (1899–1990)
 Anthony Davis, USA (born 1951)
 Gussie Lord Davis, USA (1863–1899)
 Edmond Dédé, USA (1827–1903)
 Leonard De Paur, USA (1914–1998)
 Robert Nathaniel Dett, Canada (1882–1943)
 John Thomas Douglass, USA (1847–1886)
 Rudolph Dunbar, Guyana (1907–1988)
 Leslie Dunner, USA (born 1956)

E

 Julius Eastman, USA (1940–1990)
 Justin Elie, Haiti (1883–1931)
 Duke Ellington (Edward Kennedy Ellington), USA (1899–1974), jazz big band leader
 Mercer Ellington, USA (1919–1996)
 Joseph Antonio Emidy, Guinea (1775–1835)
 Akin Euba, Nigeria (1935–2020)
 James Reese Europe, USA (1881–1919)

F
 Donal Fox, USA (born 1952)

G
 José Maurício Nunes Garcia, Brazil (1767–1830)
 Philip Gbeho, Ghana (1904–1976)
 Kerry J. Gilliard, USA (born 1972)
 Harry P. Guy, USA (1870–1950)

H
 Adolphus Hailstork, USA (born 1941)
 W. C. Handy (William Christopher Handy), USA (1873–1958), blues
 Edward W. Hardy, USA (born 1992), composer, violinist
 Robert A. Harris, USA (born 1938)
 Henry Hart, USA (1839–1915)
 Scott Hayden, USA (1882–1915), ragtime
 Talib Rasul Hakim, USA (1940–1988)
 Fletcher Henderson, USA (1897–1952), jazz big band leader
 Ernest Hogan, USA (1865–1909)
 Moses Hogan, USA (1957–2003)
 David Hurd, USA (born 1950)

I
 Abdullah Ibrahim, South Africa (born 1934)

J

 Michael Jackson, USA (1958–2009), singer-songwriter, producer, dancer, choreographer, musician, businessman
 Tony Jackson, USA (1876–1921), pianist
 Leroy Jenkins, USA (1932–2007)
 Jose Julian Jiménez, Cuba (1823–1880)
 Lico Jiménez (José Manuel Jiménez Berroa), Cuba (1851–1917)
 Francis Johnson, USA (1792–1844)
 Hall Johnson, USA (1888–1970)
 James Price Johnson, USA (1894–1955)
 J. Rosamond Johnson, USA (1873–1954)
 Victor C. Johnson, USA (born 1978)
 Trevor Jones, South Africa and United Kingdom (born 1949), film composer
 Scott Joplin, USA (1868–1917)
 Quincy Jones, USA (born 1933)
 Joe Jordan, USA (1882–1971)

K
 Ulysses Simpson Kay, USA (1917–1995)

L
 Vicente Lusitano, Portugal, born in the early 1500s
 Charles Lucien Lambert, USA (c. 1828–1896)
 Lucien-Léon Guillaume Lambert, France (1858–1945)
 Sidney Lambert, USA (1838–1905)
 Ludovic Lamothe, Haiti (1882–1953)
 Tania León, Cuba (born 1943)
 John Lewis, USA (1920–2001)
 Melba Liston, USA (1926–1999)
 Sam Lucas, USA (1850–1916)

M

 Bobby McFerrin (Robert McFerrin Jr.), USA (born 1950), jazz composer-vocalist-conductor
 Wynton Marsalis, USA (born 1961)
 Arthur Marshall, USA (1881–1968), ragtime
 Paul D. Miller aka DJ Spooky, USA (born 1970)
 Charles Mingus, USA (1922–1979)
 Roscoe Mitchell, USA (born 1940)
 Thelonious Monk, USA (1917–1982)
 Carman Moore, USA (born 1936)
 Undine Smith Moore, USA (1904–1989)
 Jeffrey Mumford, USA (born 1955)
 Diedre Murray, USA (born 1951)
 Billy Myles (William Myles Nobles), USA (1924–2005)

N

 Brian Raphael Nabors, USA (born 1991)
 Gary Powell Nash, USA (born 1964)
 Oliver Nelson, USA (1932–1975)
 J. H. Kwabena Nketia, Ghana (1921–2019)

P
 Coleridge-Taylor Perkinson, USA (1932–2004)
 Julia Perry, USA (1924–1979)
 Zenobia Powell Perry, USA (1908–2004)
 Marvin Peterson, USA (born 1948), jazz composer
 Armand John Piron, USA (1888–1943)
 Florence Beatrice Price, USA (1887–1953)
 Prince, USA (1958–2016)

R
 Amadeo Roldán, Cuba (1900–1939)
 Sonny Rollins, USA (born 1930)

S

 Chevalier de Saint-Georges, Guadeloupe (c. 1739–1799)
 Ignatius Sancho, England, (c. 1729–1780)
 James Scott, USA (1886–1938)
 Jacob J. Sawyer, USA (1856–1885)
 Wayne Shorter, USA (born 1933)
 Alvin Singleton, USA (born 1940)
 Chris Smith, USA (1879–1949)
 Hale Smith, USA (1925–2009)
 Fela Sowande, Nigeria (1905–1987)
 William Grant Still, USA (1895–1978)
 Howard Swanson, USA (1907–1978)
 Billy Strayhorn (William Thomas Strayhorn), USA (1917–1967), one of the most highly regarded jazz and big band composers and arrangers; Ellington's friend and arranger

T
 Shirley Thompson, English-born composer of Jamaican descent
 Henry Threadgill, USA (born 1944), jazz composer
 Dean Clay Taylor, USA (born 1943), classical composer

W

 George Walker, USA (1922–2018)
 Fats Waller, USA (1904–1943), singer, jazz musician
 Pete Wentz, bassist of the band Fall Out Boy
 Randy Weston, USA (1926–2018)
 Clarence Cameron White, USA (1880–1960)
 Joseph White (José Silvestre White Lafitte) Cuba (1835–1918)
 Thomas Wiggins (Bethune) or "Blind Tom", USA (1849–1908)
 Clarence Williams, USA (1898–1965)
 Julius Penson Williams, USA (born 1954)
 Mary Lou Williams, USA (1910–1981)
 Olly Wilson, USA (1937–2018)
 John Wesley Work III, USA (1901–1967)
 Stevie Wonder, (born 1950)

Z
 Pamela Z, USA (born 1956)

Dates of birth and death are unknown for several composers whose music, published during the 19th century, is described in "Historical Notes on African-American and Jamaican Melodies". These composers include Harry Bloodgood, Samuel Butler, Dudley C. Clark, Harry Davis, Pete Devonear, Fred C. Lyons, Henry Newman, James S. Putnam, and Francis V. Seymour.

See also 
 Lists of African Americans
 Negermusik

References 

 Tim Brooks, Lost Sounds: Blacks and the Birth of the Recording Industry, 1890–1919, Urbana and Chicago: University of Illinois Press, 2004.
 Samuel A. Floyd, Jr., editor, International Dictionary of Black Composers, Chicago: Center for Black Music Research, Fitzroy Dearborn Publishers, two volumes, 1999.
 Eileen Southern, Biographical Dictionary of Afro-American and African Musicians, Westport, Connecticut: Greenwood Press, 1982.
 Lester Sullivan, "Composers of Color of Nineteenth-Century New Orleans: The History Behind the Music", Black Music Research Journal, vol. 8, no. 1 (1988), 51–82.

External links 
 Orchestral Music of African-American Composers
 Discography of Center for Black Music Research: Music by Black Composers
 Classical Music Recordings of Black Composers: a reference guide
 Historical Notes on African-American Melodies and Composers
 Historical Notes on African Melodies and Composers
 Black History and Classical Music
 Myrtle Hart Society
 Composers of African Descent
 Perspectives of Black Composers
 Afrocentric Voices in Classical Music

African
 
 
Composers
composers